Ctenus vespertilio is a species of spider from the family Ctenidae. The scientific name of this species was first published in 1941 by Cândido Firmino de Mello-Leitão, found in Colombia.

References

Ctenidae
Spiders of South America
Spiders described in 1941